Wortley was a rural district in the West Riding of Yorkshire from 1894 to 1974, situated to the north-west of the county borough of Sheffield.

It was abolished in 1974 under the Local Government Act 1972, with the parishes of Bradfield and Ecclesfield going to the metropolitan borough of Sheffield and the parishes of Tankersley and Wortley going to the Metropolitan Borough of Barnsley.

References
Wortley RD at Vision of Britain

History of South Yorkshire
Districts of England created by the Local Government Act 1894
Districts of England abolished by the Local Government Act 1972
Rural districts of the West Riding of Yorkshire